Laat Saab is a 1992 Bollywood film produced and directed by Sunil Agnihotri. This film was inspired by Raj Khosla's classic thriller Woh Kaun Thi?. This is the last known film of veteran actor K.N. Singh who shares his original name in the film. Actor A.K. Hangal had negative shades in his character of a crook called Dmello. The Spirit of Neelam (Anju) disappearing with Jackie Shroff's (Vijay) coat was based on a story which took place in the 6os in Bombay, known as Sandra from Bandra.

Plot
Born on the 17th of September in Uttar Pradesh, Vijay Rai leads a wealthy lifestyle along with his dad, Ajay Kumar, who are now settled in scenic Simla. Since Vijay is 25 years old, his dad wants him to get married, but Vijay wants to find his own soul mate. He does find her in Bombay-based Anju, both meet and fall in love with each other. When Anju is informed that her dad is ill, she returns home, and leaves a note for Vijay to contact her there. Upon receiving her note, Vijay departs for Bombay and reaches Anju's residence. He is received by her dad, Dinanath, who informs him that Anju has been dead for over 3 years now. A disbelieving Vijay, assisted by CBI Inspector Jayant Mathur, decides to trace Anju. He and Jayant do find her, but she claims that she has never met Vijay and identifies herself as Mona, a Goa-based dancer/singer. Vijay must now accept Anju's death and move on little knowing that if he persists he will soon be declared insane as none of the people he has come across thus far are who they claim to be

Cast
 Jackie Shroff
 Neelam Kothari
  Mohsin Khan
 K. N. Singh
 Saeed Jaffrey
 Ishrat Ali
 Asrani
 A.K. Hangal
 Sushma Seth

Music
Gulshan Bawra wrote the songs.

"Churaya Tune Dil Mera" - Udit Narayan, Alka Yagnik
"Dedo De Do Mujhe Dil" - Kumar Sanu, Alka Yagnik
"Ek Tuhi Mera Sahara" - Alka Yagnik
"Hirni Jaisi Aankhonwali" - Kumar Sanu
"Battiya Bujhegi" - Asha Bhosle

References

External links 
 

Films scored by Anu Malik
1990s Hindi-language films
Films directed by Sunil Agnihotri